Snow dragon may refer to:

 MV Xue Long (雪龙, literally "Snow Dragon"), Chinese polar research vessel
 Kuraokami (Okami no kami), the Japanese dragon deity of snow
 Snow Dragons, a business run by Paul Walker
 "Snow Dragons", a 2009 short story by Elizabeth Bear
 "Snow Dragons", a 1999 season 1 episode of Dragon Tales, see List of Dragon Tales episodes
 Snow Dragon Glacier Cave System, of the Sandy Glacier Caves, Oregon, United States
 Snow Dragon (film), a 2013 Czech television film